Solenocera alfonso is a species of decapod within the family Solenoceridae. The species is found in the eastern Indian Ocean and western central Pacific Ocean near countries such as the Philippines, Indonesia, and Australia at depths of 176 to 547 meters near benthic environments. It grows to lengths of 4 to 12 centimeters.

References 

Crustaceans described in 1981
Marine fauna of Australia
Crustaceans of the Indian Ocean
Crustaceans of the Pacific Ocean
Solenoceridae